Ottsville is an unincorporated community in Tinicum Township in Bucks County, Pennsylvania, United States, with parts of the community located in neighboring Nockamixon Township. Ottsville is located at the intersection of Creamery Road/Geigel Hill Road and Durham Road, north a short distance east of Pennsylvania Route 611.

Education
Residents of Ottsville are part of the Palisades School District.

References

Unincorporated communities in Bucks County, Pennsylvania
Unincorporated communities in Pennsylvania